Blažejovice is a municipality and village in Benešov District in the Central Bohemian Region of the Czech Republic. It has about 100 inhabitants.

Administrative parts
The village of Vítonice is an administrative part of Blažejovice.

References

Villages in Benešov District